Holy Cross Church is a Church of England parish church in Ryton, Tyne and Wear. The church is a Grade I listed building.

History
The Holy Cross church is the oldest building in Ryton and dates back to 1220. The most striking feature of the church is its 13th-century broach spire which is 36 m tall. Other well known artefacts include a 13th-century Frosterly marble effigy of a deacon holding a book.

Notable clergy
There have been a number of prominent rectors of Ryton. These include: Thomas Secker (1727), later the Archbishop of Canterbury; Charles Thorp (1807) virtual founder and first warden of the University of Durham; and The Hon. Richard Byron (1769), brother of William Byron, 5th Baron Byron and great-uncle of Lord Byron.

References

External links
 Main website
 A Church Near You entry

13th-century church buildings in England
Church of England church buildings in Tyne and Wear
Church of England church buildings in County Durham
Ryton
Ryton, Tyne and Wear